20th Century Masters – The Millennium Collection: The Best of Steely Dan, released in 2007 by Universal Music as part of their 20th Century Masters – The Millennium Collection series, is a CD that collects early material by Steely Dan.

Track listing
"Do It Again"
"Reelin' in the Years"
"Only a Fool Would Say That"
"My Old School"
"Rikki Don't Lose That Number"
"Any World (That I'm Welcome To)"
"Deacon Blues"
"Josie"
"Time Out Of Mind"
"Third World Man"

References

Steely Dan
2007 greatest hits albums
Steely Dan compilation albums
Geffen Records compilation albums